Xinjian Township is a township under the administration of Ningnan County, in southern Sichuan, China. , it has four villages under its administration.

References 

Township-level divisions of Sichuan
Ningnan County